The Haryana cricket team is a domestic cricket team run by the Haryana Cricket Association, representing the state of Haryana, India. The team participates in the Ranji Trophy, the top tier domestic first-class cricket tournament in India, as well as the Vijay Hazare Trophy, the top tier domestic List A tournament in India, and the Syed Mushtaq Ali Trophy, a domestic T20 tournament in India. It has won the Ranji Trophy once and finished as runner-up once. It has also won the Irani Cup once. The great Indian all-rounder, Kapil Dev, played for Haryana at the domestic level.

Competition history
Haryana first competed at first-class level in the 1970–71 Ranji Trophy, captained by Ravinder Chadha, who went on to captain the team for 18 seasons. They won their second match, when Chadha scored their first century and also took nine wickets.

Haryana have appeared in two Ranji Trophy finals. The first time, in 1986 against Delhi, resulted in a heavy defeat. Electing to bat first, the Haryana team (captained by Kapil Dev) were all out for 288. Delhi replied with a mammoth 638, then dismissed Haryana for 209, Maninder Singh taking eight wickets.

Haryana's next final was in 1991 against very experienced Mumbai team including players like Sachin Tendulkar, Dilip Vengsarkar and Lalchand Rajput, which Haryana (also captained by Kapil Dev) won by just two runs in Wankhede Stadium, Mumbai. 

This allowed them to make their only appearance in the Irani Trophy, facing a Rest of India side that included Sourav Ganguly, Javagal Srinath, Maninder Singh and Vinod Kambli. Haryana won by four wickets after being set a target of 204 in Nahar Singh Stadium, Faridabad.

As of mid-January 2023, Haryana had played 330 first-class matches, of which they had won 114, lost 87 and drawn 129.

Honours
 Ranji Trophy
 Winners (1): 1990–91
 Runners-up (1): 1985–86
Wills Trophy
 Runners-up (2): 1994-95, 1996-97

Famous players

Players from Haryana who have played Test cricket for India, along with year of Test debut:

Kapil Dev (1978)
Ashok Malhotra (1982)
Chetan Sharma (1984)
Ajay Jadeja (1992)
Vijay Yadav (1993)
Ajay Ratra (2002)
Amit Mishra (2008)
Jayant Yadav (2016)

Players from Haryana who have played ODI but not Test cricket for India, along with year of ODI debut :

Joginder Sharma (2004) 
Mohit Sharma (2013)
Yuzvendra Chahal (2016)

Notable players at the domestic level:
Amarjit Kaypee
Rajinder Goel

Current squad 
●Head coach – Surendra Bhave

Players with international caps are listed in bold.

Updated as on 24 January 2023

References

External links
India - Domestic Cricket : Cricinfo's Complete History of the Indian Domestic Competitions

Indian first-class cricket teams
Cricket in Haryana
1970 establishments in Haryana
Cricket clubs established in 1970